Henry Bidleman Bascom (1796–1850) was an American Bishop of the Methodist Episcopal Church, South, elected in 1850.  He also distinguished himself as a circuit rider, pastor and Christian preacher; as chaplain to the U.S. House of Representatives; and as an editor, a college academic, and a denominational leader.

Early life and education
Of French Huguenot and Basque ancestry, Henry Bidleman Bascom was born 27 May 1796 in Hancock, Delaware County, New York. He was a descendant of Thomas Bascom, who came to the Massachusetts Bay Colony in 1634 and who later founded Windsor, Connecticut. The name Bidleman came from the family of Henry's maternal grandmother, Rosanna Bidleman.

Henry Bascom joined the Methodist Episcopal Church in western Pennsylvania in 1811 after his family migrated to the frontier area.

Marriage and family
Bascom married Eliza Van Antwerp on 7 March 1839 in New York City.

Ministry
At a time of expansion of the Methodist Church on the frontier during the Second Great Awakening, new men were accepted into preaching. Although with little formal education, Bascom was found to be a good speaker with knowledge of the Bible; he was licensed to preach in 1813 at the age of seventeen and was received on trial by the Ohio Annual Conference of the Methodist Episcopal Church.  Rev. Bascom worked hard as a frontier circuit rider, traveling to scattered settlements across a wide territory.  For example, one year he preached 400 times, receiving a salary of $12.10.  He soon became noted as a pulpit orator.

His style was considered too florid to suit many in Ohio, so in 1816 he was transferred to Tennessee.  He served appointments there and in Kentucky until 1822, when he returned to Ohio.

The Rev. Henry Bidleman Bascom was awarded the honorary degree Doctor of Divinity.

Bascom as pulpit orator
The Bishop Matthew Simpson, in his Cyclopaedia of Methodism (1880), wrote about Rev. Henry Bidleman Bascom's pulpit ministry:
"At one point, he was perhaps the most popular pulpit orator in the United States.  His sermons, though long, did not weary the people.  They were evidently prepared with great care.  As is often the case, in reading his sermons we miss the brilliancy and vivacity of the living speaker.  He was a man of remarkably fine personal appearance, and had a voice of great compass and power."

Congressional chaplain
In 1823 the Congressman Henry Clay from Kentucky, then Speaker of the House, obtained for Bascom the appointment of Chaplain of the U.S. House of Representatives, where he served 1824–26.  At one time Bascom visited Baltimore, where his fervid oratory made a great sensation.  He was known as a powerful speaker, fond of strong epithets and extravagant metaphors.

Academic and editorial ministry
Rev. Bascom was selected as the first president of Madison College, Uniontown, Pennsylvania (1827–29).  He became an agent of the American Colonization Society (1829–31), working to help resettle American free blacks in Liberia, Africa.

In 1832 Bascom was hired as professor of moral science and belles-lettres at Augusta College, an early Methodist school in Kentucky. He taught there until 1842.

Rev. Bascom was selected as president of Transylvania University in Lexington, Kentucky (1842–49; he had declined two other offers).

From 1846 until 1850, Rev. Bascom edited the Southern Methodist Quarterly Review.  He was a delegate to every M.E. General Conference from 1828 until 1844.

Methodist schism
Rev. Bascom played an important role at the M.E. General Conference of 1844, when the denomination divided over the question of slavery.  The Church suspended Bishop James Osgood Andrew because he refused to manumit his slaves.

Dr. Bascom wrote the "protest of the minority" of the Southern members against this action by the majority, which became known as the denomination split.  He was a member of the convention held the next year at Louisville, at which the M.E. Church, South, was organized. Bascom wrote its report.

Bascom was selected as chairman of the commission appointed to settle the differences between the two branches of the Church, but it did not reunite until 1939, long after the end of the American Civil War.  He  published a book in defense of the Southern church, entitled Methodism and Slavery; with Other Matters in Controversy between the North and the South; Being a Review of the Manifesto of the Majority, in Reply to the Protest of the Minority, of the Late General Conference of the Methodist E. Church, in the Case of Bishop Andrew (1845; available free on line at Google Books).

Elected bishop
Bascom was elected to the episcopacy by the General Conference of the Methodist Episcopal Church, South in 1850 at St. Louis.  He was consecrated a Bishop in May 1850, a few months before his death.

Death and burial
Bishop Bascom died 8 September 1850 in Louisville, Kentucky.  His remains were interred in Louisville's Eastern Cemetery.  Photos of the grave stone can be seen on Find a Grave: Henry Bidleman Bascom

The communities of Bascom, Florida, and Bascom, Texas, were named in his honor.

Selected writings
 Methodism and Slavery(1845), free e-text available
 Sermons from the Pulpit
 Lectures on Infidelity
 Lectures on Moral and Mental Science
 His collected works (4 volumes) were edited by Rev. T.N. Ralston and printed at Nashville (1850 and 1856).

Biographies
 Henkle, M.M., Life of Bishop Bascom, Nashville, 1854.

See also
List of bishops of the United Methodist Church

Notes

References
 Cyclopaedia of Methodism, Matthew Simpson, D.D., LL.D., Ed., (Revised Edition.)  Philadelphia, Louis H. Everts, 1880.
 "Henry Bidleman Bascom", The Columbia Electronic Encyclopedia © 1994, 2000–2005, on Infoplease.
 "Bascom, Henry Bidleman", in The New Schaff-Herzog Encyclopedia of Religious Knowledge,  ed., Samuel Macauley Jackson, D.D., LL.D., Grand Rapids, Michigan: Baker Book House, 1954

1796 births
1850 deaths
Chaplains of the United States House of Representatives
Bishops of the Methodist Episcopal Church, South
American religion academics
American theologians
Methodist theologians
American people of Basque descent
Methodist writers
American Methodist Episcopal, South bishops
American sermon writers
American magazine editors
Editors of Christian publications
Methodist ministers
People from Augusta, Kentucky
Burials in Kentucky
Transylvania University people
Transylvania University faculty
19th-century Methodist bishops
19th-century American bishops